Teejay Lanka PLC formerly known as Textured Jersey Lanka is a knitted fabric manufacturer in Sri Lanka and is one of the constituents of the S&P Sri Lanka 20 Index of the Colombo Stock Exchange. The company received the award of the best textile exporter in Sri Lanka at the Presidential Export Awards in 2019 and ranked amongst the 100 most respected companies in the country by the LMD magazine. The company is a supplier to the brands such as Nike, PVH, L Brands, Marks & Spencer, Decathlon, Lidl, and Calzedonia.

History
In 2000, Textured Jersey Lanka was founded as a joint venture between Linea Clothing and Textured Jersey UK. In 2004, Pacific Textile Holdings acquired Textured Jersey UK's stake in the company. In 2007, shareholding changed with Brandix joining Pacific Textiles, and in 2011 the company was listed publicly. In 2016, the company was rebranded as Teejay Lanka. In 2021, Teejay Lanka won the award for the best textile exporter at the Presidential Export Awards for the third consecutive year. Sri Lankan business executive, Ajit Gunawardene was appointed as the chairman of the company in 2022.

Operations
The company carries out manufacturing operations in Sri Lanka as well as in India. Despite the lockdowns due to the COVID-19 pandemic in Sri Lanka and India, Teejay Lanka was able to post a net profit of LKR 2.4 billion in the fiscal year of 2019/20 which is an improvement of 28 percent over the last year. During the pandemic Tejay Lanka moved to manufacture personal protective equipment or PPE as a strategic decision.

Legal issues
On August 10, 2020, the Colombo Magistrate Court issued a notice on the company to appear before the court in connection to an alleged attempt to dump hazardous waste into the ocean through a contract.

See also
 List of Sri Lankan public corporations by market capitalisation
 Apparel industry of Sri Lanka

References

External links
 Official website

2000 establishments in Sri Lanka
Companies listed on the Colombo Stock Exchange
Clothing companies of India
Clothing companies of Sri Lanka
Toray Industries